The men's 4 × 400 metres relay event at the 2018 African Championships in Athletics was held on 4 and 5 August in Asaba, Nigeria.

Medalists

* Athletes who competed in heats only and received medals.

Results

Heats
Qualification: First 3 teams of each heat (Q) plus the next 2 fastest (q) qualified for the final.

Note: Some information was gathered from the video of the races

Final

References

2018 African Championships in Athletics
Relays at the African Championships in Athletics